Camelot is the legendary stronghold of King Arthur.

Camelot may also refer to:

Arts and entertainment
Camelot (musical), a 1960 Broadway musical based on the legend
Camelot (film), a 1967 film based on the musical
"Camelot" (song), a song by NLE Choppa
Camelot (TV series), a 2011 television series
"Camelot" (The Goodies), an episode of the British television series The Goodies
"Camelot" (Stargate SG-1), an episode of the American-Canadian television series Stargate SG-1
Kamelot, an American power metal band
Kaamelott, a French TV comedy series

Buildings
Camelot (State College, Pennsylvania), a house listed on the National Register of Historic Places
Camelot (hotel), the original name of The Edgewater, a hotel in Seattle
Camelot, Kirkham, a heritage-listed house in Sydney, Australia

Companies and organisations
Camelot Ghana, a printing company in Ghana
Camelot Group, operators of the National Lottery in the United Kingdom
Camelot Property Management, a vacant property management firm started in the Netherlands
Camelot Software Planning, a Japanese software publisher and developer
Camelot Management Consultants AG, an international consulting firm with focus on Supply Chain Management

Games
Camelot (board game), a strategy board game marketed by Parker Brothers, mainly in the early 20th century
Camelot (video game), a 1989 video game for Acorn computers, published by Superior Software

Places
Camelot Theme Park, a former theme park in Lancashire, England
Camelot (ward), an electoral ward in Somerset, England
 Camelot (crater), a crater in Taurus-Littrow valley on the Moon

Transport
SS Camelot, a ship owned by the British Ministry of Transport from 1965 to 1969
BR Standard Class 5 73082 Camelot, a BR Standard Class 5 steam engine preserved on the Bluebell Railway

Other
Camelot (horse), champion Irish racehorse
9500 Camelot (1281 T-2), an asteroid named "Camelot", discovered in 1973, the 9500th registered, see List of minor planets: 9001–10000
Camelot era, a nickname for the John F. Kennedy Administration, stressing its glamorous, media-culture image
Camlet, a woven fabric that may have originally been made of camel or goat hair
Camelot, a document format that later became PDF
 Project Camelot, a 1960s U.S. government counterinsurgency study
 Camelotia, a dinosaur from England

See also
King Arthur (disambiguation)